Keiran Dion Monlouis (born 15 April 1995) is a footballer who plays as a midfielder for Ebbsfleet United. Born in England, Monlouis represents the Saint Lucia national football team. After playing youth football for Crystal Palace, Stoke City and Charlton Athletic, Monlouis has played senior football for Maldon & Tiptree, AFC Sudbury, St Albans City, Hamilton Academical, Hemel Hempstead Town, Dulwich Hamlet, Margate and Horsham.

Club career
Born in Lewisham, Monlouis played youth football for Crystal Palace, Stoke City and Charlton Athletic, but was released by Charlton Athletic at the end of the 2014–15 season. In July 2015, Monlouis signed for Maldon & Tiptree of the Isthmian League Division One North as part of a new co-operation between Maldon & Tiptree and Colchester United. He scored 3 goals in 38 league appearances during the 2015–16 season. He had an unsuccessful trial spell with Norwich City in summer 2016. He made 15 league appearances without scoring for Maldon & Tiptree cross the 2016–17 season, the last of which came on 7 January 2017.

Following a one-month trial spell with Barnet, he signed for Isthmian League Premier Division AFC Sudbury on 16 February 2017. He made his debut for the club that day in a 1–0 win over Worthing. In March 2017, he signed for National League South side St Albans City, after just 8 appearances for Sudbury. He made his debut for St Albans on 25 March 2017 as a substitute in a 1–0 win at home to Dartford. He made 6 more league appearances from them until the end of the season. He scored twice in 38 league matches across the 2017–18 season.

In August 2018, he signed for Scottish Premiership club Hamilton Academical on a two-year deal. He left Hamilton in January 2019 without playing for the club. He signed for Hemel Hempstead Town of the National League South in February 2019. He scored 1 goal in 12 league matches for Hemel Hempstead Town.

Monlouis joined National League South club Dulwich Hamlet in the summer of 2019. On 23 November 2019, he was loaned out to Margate for one month. The deal was later extended until the end of January 2020. He returned to Dulwich Hamlet at the end of his loan on 31 January 2020, having made 11 league appearances and scoring 1 goal. He left Dulwich Hamlet in summer 2020, having scored once in 14 league appearances for the club.

Monlouis signed for Horsham in August 2020 after playing for the club in pre-season.

In June 2021, Monlois joined National League South side Ebbsfleet United.

Monlouis scored on his debut for Ebbsfleet United in a 1-0 win over Aylesbury United in the FA Cup 3rd round of qualifying.

International career
Born in England, Monlouis is of Saint Lucian descent. Monlouis made his professional debut for the Saint Lucia in a 2019–20 CONCACAF Nations League 1–0 win over the Dominican Republic on 16 November 2019.

References

External links
 

1995 births
Living people
Footballers from Lewisham
People with acquired Saint Lucian citizenship
Saint Lucian footballers
Saint Lucia international footballers
English footballers
English people of Saint Lucian descent
Association football midfielders
Crystal Palace F.C. players
Stoke City F.C. players
Charlton Athletic F.C. players
Maldon & Tiptree F.C. players
A.F.C. Sudbury players
St Albans City F.C. players
Hamilton Academical F.C. players
Hemel Hempstead Town F.C. players
Dulwich Hamlet F.C. players
Margate F.C. players
Horsham F.C. players
Ebbsfleet United F.C. players
National League (English football) players
Isthmian League players